Southern Albania is one of the three NUTS-2 Regions of Albania. This  ethnographical territory is sometimes referred to as Toskeria.

It consists of five counties: Berat, Fier, Gjirokastër, Korçë and Vlorë.

The southwestern part of the country is rich in petroleum, and natural gas. Natural asphalt is mined near Selenicë.

See also
Northern Albania (Ghegeria or Gegeria)
Central Albania
Southern Albanian Highlands

References

Subdivisions of Albania
NUTS 2 statistical regions of Albania